The Solomon Islands Social Credit Party ("Socreds") is a political party in the Solomon Islands that espouses social credit theories of monetary reform.

It is led by Prime Minister Manasseh Sogavare, previously leader of the People's Progressive Party and the former Member of Parliament for East Choiseul. The party was launched in July 2005.

It is a member of a four-party coalition, the Solomon Islands Alliance for Change, which includes the National Party, Solomon Islands Liberal Party, and the Solomon Islands Party for Rural Advancement, and groups of independents from Honiara, Malaita and Guadalcanal.

The Solomon Islands Social Credit Party traces its origins to the New Zealand Social Credit Party and one of its leaders, Bruce Beetham, who hosted a Solomon Islands student in his home. That student, Solomon Mamaloni, later became prime minister of the Solomon Islands.

The party, running candidates for the first time, contested 29 constituencies in the April 5, 2006, national election. The party won 4.3% of the vote and 2 seats.

The party opposes foreign control of the economy, and advocates a full monetary and financial reform in line with the ideology of social credit. It believes that the islands' poverty can only be addressed through social credit monetary reform.

See also
Social credit
List of political parties in the Solomon Islands

References

External links
Australian Broadcasting Corporation interview with Manasseh Sogavare

Political parties in the Solomon Islands
Social credit parties
Main
Political parties established in 2005
2005 establishments in the Solomon Islands